Dominic John Sebastian Knight (born 26 January 1977) is an Australian novelist, comedy writer, radio host and media commentator.  Best known as a member of the Australian political satire comedy Logie Awardwinning group The Chaser, he is also an occasional writer, columnist and blogger for the Sydney Morning Herald, and a former host of Evenings on ABC Local Radio across NSW and the ACT.  Along with fellow Sydney University students Charles Firth, Julian Morrow and Craig Reucassel, Knight founded The Chaser newspaper, launched in May 1999.

Biography
Knight was educated at Sydney Grammar School, where he met fellow Chaser members Chas Licciardello and Charles Firth. He holds a Bachelor of Laws degree from the University of Sydney, a Master of Arts in Professional Writing from the University of Technology, Sydney, and a Doctor of Arts from the University of Sydney.  He is the brother of Australian painter Jasper Knight and the grandson of former Reserve Bank Governor Sir Harold Knight.

He worked as a writer on The Hamster Wheel, an Australian Broadcasting Corporation television program which was written and performed by the members of The Chaser comedy group. Unlike his colleagues, Dominic rarely presents on the program on-screen but has done some cameo appearances: television credits include Chaser News Alert and his role as a reporter for two series of CNNNN. He also contributed to the commentary track for the second volume of The Chaser's War on Everything DVD.

During January 2007, he acted as Triple M's drive time summer fill-in along with Chas Licciardello. Their show, Chas and Dom from 'The Chaser', aired between 4 pm and 6 pm on weekdays from 2 to 25 January, and often included guest appearances from their Chaser colleagues.

Knight also writes for the Sydney Morning Herald, contributing opinion pieces, wrote for the now defunct liftout Radar, and blogged on the 2007 New South Wales election campaign. He writes a weekly column for the Fairfax Media website Daily Life.

In September 2007, Knight was questioned by police, alongside fellow Chaser members Chris Taylor and Craig Reucassel after they strapped on cardboard cars (limousines) and "drove" around Sydney in the wake of Licciardello and Morrow's arrest for entering a restricted zone without justification during the APEC Summit.

In 2008, Knight toured Australia as part of the Chaser team's stage show, The Chaser's Age of Terror Variety Hour.

In recent years he has appeared on the national television political commentary programs Paul Murray Live on Sky News Australia and The Drum on ABC News 24.

In January 2012, Knight replaced Robbie Buck as the Evenings presenter on 702 ABC Sydney, 1233 ABC Newcastle, 666 ABC Canberra and ABC Local Radio stations across New South Wales. He left the show in April 2016 and has presented other programs on the network on a casual basis since. He succeeded the retiring Tony Delroy as interim Nightlife presenter in September and October 2016.

Knight is now back on Triple M Sydney with "Radio Chaser" from 3-4pm Weekdays and nationally with the Platinum Edition on Saturday.

Published works
 ; a humorous novel.
 ;< a humorous noel which concerned a fictional student election at the University of Sydney.
 ; a romantic fictional novel.
  A satirical overview of Australia, acknowledging a debt to Wikipedia; a portion of the proceeds is promised to the Wikimedia Foundation [op cit, p. 1]

References

External links
 
 Dominic Knight's Sydney Morning Herald News Blog
 Dominic Knight at Daily Life

The Chaser members
Australian television writers
ABC radio (Australia) journalists and presenters
Triple M presenters
Australian male comedians
Comedians from Sydney
1977 births
Living people
Place of birth missing (living people)
People educated at Sydney Grammar School
Australian male television writers